Kamlesh Saini is an Indian politician and a member of 17th Legislative Assembly, Uttar Pradesh of India. He represents the ‘Chandpur’ constituency in Bijnor district of Uttar Pradesh.

Political career
Kamlesh Saini contested Uttar Pradesh Assembly Election as Bharatiya Janata Party candidate and defeated his close contestant Mohammad Iqbal from Bahujan Samaj Party with a margin of 35,649 votes.

Posts held

References

Year of birth missing (living people)
Living people
Uttar Pradesh MLAs 2017–2022
Bharatiya Janata Party politicians from Uttar Pradesh